Jutta Kleinschmidt (born 29 August 1962) is a German competitor of offroad automotive racing events. She is known for her numerous showings in the Paris Dakar Rally, and notably for having won the event in 2001, becoming the only woman driver to win the race and the only German to win the car category. In 2013, Kleinschmidt was named an FIM Legend for her motorcycling achievements.

Biography

She was born in Cologne, Germany, and grew up in Berchtesgaden, Upper Bavaria. She studied physics at Isny Polytech then worked at BMW. She raced her first Paris-Dakar Rally in 1988 on a BMW motorcycle. In 1994, she switched to driving a car and, in 1997, became the first woman to win a stage of the Rally. The following year, she was on the podium and, in 2001, she became the first woman to win the Rally.

Racing record

Dakar Rally

Complete Extreme E results
(key)

* Season still in progress.

References

External links

1962 births
Living people
German female racing drivers
Sportspeople from Cologne
People from Berchtesgaden
Sportspeople from Upper Bavaria
Racing drivers from Bavaria
Racing drivers from North Rhine-Westphalia
German expatriates in Monaco
German racing drivers
Female rally drivers
Off-road racing drivers
Dakar Rally drivers
Dakar Rally winning drivers
Extreme E drivers
Abt Sportsline drivers
Nürburgring 24 Hours drivers
Volkswagen Motorsport drivers
Cupra Racing drivers